Harpur is a small village located in the Rajpur block of Buxar district, Bihar. It has a total of 417 families residing in it. The population of the village is 2799 out of which 1431 are males and 1368 are females.

Administration
Harpur village is administrated by Mukhiya through its Gram Panchayat, who is elected representative of village as per constitution of India and Panchyati Raj Act.

References

External links
Villages in Buxar

Villages in Buxar district